Martín Alund and Juan-Martín Aranguren were the champions in 2009 but decided not to participate.
Facundo Argüello and Agustín Velotti won the final against Claudio Grassi and Luca Vanni 7–6(7–4), 7–6(7–5).

Seeds

Draw

Draw

References
 Main Draw

Lima Challenger - Doubles
2012 Doubles